The Paramaccan or Paramaka (French: Pamak) are a Maroon tribe living in the forested interior of Suriname, mainly in the Paramacca resort, and the western border area of French Guiana. The Paramaccan signed a peace treaty in 1872 granting the tribe autonomy.

Overview
The tribe controls 13 villages in Suriname, and the village of Providence in neighbouring French Guiana.

The total population in 2014 was estimated at 11,000 people with 4,300 people living in the tribal areas in Suriname, and 1,000 living in the interior of French Guiana.

History
The Paramaccans were runaway slaves from the Handtros or Entros plantation who fled around 1830. In 1856, the August Kappler reported that the tribe had established villages near the Paramacca Creek. In 1872, they had signed a peace treaty with the Dutch colony giving the tribe autonomy, and Frans Kwaku, the leader of the expedition to Paramaribo, was officially appointed granman by the Governor. In 1879, a group of about 90 Paramaccans led by Apensa created a settlement on an island in the Marowijne River near the mouth of the Paramacca Creek. The town was named  (Long Island). During the Surinamese Interior War, the Paramaccans sided with the Jungle Commando, which resulted in a large migration to French Guiana.

Language

Paramaccan is also the eponymous term for their language, which is English-based with influences from Dutch, African languages, and other languages. It is similar to the languages spoken by the Ndyuka and Kwinti, and mutually intelligible with Sranan Tongo.  Paramaccan is the youngest of the Surinamese pidgin languages. The language had an estimated 2,000 to 3,000 speakers in 1991.

Villages
 Langatabiki (Suriname)
 Lokaloka (Suriname)
 Nason (Suriname)
 Providence (French Guiana)
 Snesiekondre (Suriname)

See also 
 Ndyuka language

Brother Mambo: Finding Africa in the Amazon, JD Lenoir with Phil Ceder (Kutukutu), Black Rose Writer, 2022.

References

Bibliography
 
 

Paramaka
Surinamese Maroons